Nigel Gray (1947 – 30 July 2016) was an English record producer. His album credits include Outlandos d'Amour (1978), Reggatta de Blanc (1979), and Zenyatta Mondatta (1980) for the Police, Kaleidoscope (1980) and Juju (1981) for Siouxsie and the Banshees, as well as five albums for Godley & Creme.

Gray was nominated for a Grammy Award for Best Engineered Album for Zenyatta Mondatta (1981) and also won two Grammys for producer of Best Rock Performance ("Don't Stand So Close to Me") and Best Rock Instrumental ("Behind My Camel").

Gray was revered by Radiohead's producer Nigel Godrich for his work on the Police's Reggatta de Blanc. Gray's production on Siouxsie and the Banshees' records with guitarist John McGeoch was also a reference for Godrich during the recording of Radiohead's "There There".

Surrey Sound Studios

1975–1987
In 1975, Gray converted a co-operative hall building on Kingston Road, Leatherhead, in southern England, into a four-track recording studio named Surrey Sound Studios, on a budget of £1,200, with his brother Chris Gray as engineer. Initially it was used as a rehearsal space and a demoing facility.

In 1977, the studio became 16-track, housing an Ampex MM1000 16-track tape machine and an Alice desk. Amongst others The Police recorded their first album Outlandos d'Amour there using this setup.

In 1978, during the recording of Godley & Creme's L album (the first in a string of five albums that the duo made there), the studio had upgraded again to 24-track with an all-MCI setup (which also included a fully-automated JH-400B console). Other artists such as the Police and Siouxsie and the Banshees recorded albums there. Singles from the Lotus Eaters and Latin Quarter made the UK Singles Chart. Other albums included Slow Crimes by the Work, and those by The Professionals, Girlschool, Tank, Hazel O'Connor and Eurogliders.

In 1983, the studio underwent further refurbishment for two months, reopening with a newly-installed Harrison MR4 console, Otari MTR-90 tape machines (24-track and 2-track) and Sony tape decks and digital recorders.

In 1987, Gray sold his studio and retired to Cornwall. His last project was the production of the album Universal Sky, the third by local band the Viewers.

His younger son Tom is a well-known British luthier, under the name Gray Guitars.

1980–1981
In 1980, thanks to the developing Surrey Sound empire, Gray began running his own record label, Surrey Sound Records, from the Leatherhead base. Despite having no hit records on the label, the label managed to get lots of good deals. However, finances eventually ran out and the record company closed at the end of 1981.

Death
On 31 July 2016, the members of the Police, Sting, Andy Summers and Stewart Copeland, reacted on a social network to Gray's death, writing: "Nigel Gray recorded the first three Police albums, the first two in his converted studio above a dairy in Leatherhead in Surrey. Nigel was a qualified medical doctor who followed his passion into music and was able to use his kindly bedside manner to coax three extraordinarily successful records from a band operating at the time on the tiniest of shoestring budgets. We simply couldn't have done it without him, that's the truth".

Collaborators
Artists for whom Nigel Gray produced or engineered include:

Simon Ådahl
Alternative TV
Code Blue
Paul Brady
England
The Escape
Eurogliders
Girlschool
Godley & Creme
Klark Kent, a pseudonym of Stewart Copeland
Sonja Kristina
Lotus Eaters
Craig McNeil
Hazel O'Connor
The Passions
Charlie Peacock
The Police
Polyphonic Size
The Professionals
Siouxsie and the Banshees
 Glacier Georges
Tank
The Viewers
Wishbone Ash
The Work
Two People

References

Further reading

External Links
Surrey Sound Records label information on uk45s80.orgfree.com

Surrey Sound Studios on discogs.com

1947 births
2016 deaths
English record producers
English audio engineers